The Gaza Railway is a  narrow gauge railway operating in southern Mozambique from Xai-Xai (former Villa de João Belo) via Manjacaze junction (53 km) with branches to Chicomo (37 km) and Mauela (50 km). It was constructed in the early 1900s for the transportation of passengers and cashew nuts. The railway operated several small American steam locomotives, including a Baldwin 2-8-0 built in 1925, a Baldwin 0-6-2 and an Alco 2-6-0. In 2000, parts of the railway line were washed away by floods and the railway hasn't been used since then.

References 

2 ft 6 in gauge railways in Mozambique